The following is a list of players of the now-defunct Washington Capitols professional basketball team.

Edward Bartels
Tommy Byrnes
Don Carlson
Hook Dillon
Bob Feerick
Bob Gantt
Chuck Gilmur
Chick Halbert
Kleggie Hermsen
Sidney Hertzberg
Ken Keller
Earl Lloyd
John Mahnken
John Mandic
Ariel Maughan
Bones McKinney
Ed Mikan
Jack Nichols
Johnny Norlander
Dick O'Keefe
Buddy O'Grady
Don Otten
Chick Reiser
Irv Rothenberg
Alan Sawyer
Herb Scherer
Dick Schnittker
Dick Schulz
Fred Scolari
Bill Sharman
Jack Tingle
Irv Torgoff
Matt Zunic

References
Washington Capitols all-time roster @ basketball-reference.com

National Basketball Association all-time rosters